Neoanalthes pseudocontortalis is a moth in the family Crambidae. It was described by Hiroshi Yamanaka and Valentina A. Kirpichnikova in 1993 and is found in Malaysia.

References

Moths described in 1993
Spilomelinae